Events from the year 1760 in Canada.

Incumbents
 French Monarch: Louis XV
 British and Irish Monarch: George II (died October 25), George III (starting October 25)

Governors
 Governor General of New France: Pierre François de Rigaud, Marquis de Vaudreuil-Cavagnal
 Colonial Governor of Louisiana: Louis Billouart
 Governor of Nova Scotia: Charles Lawrence
 Commodore-Governor of Newfoundland: James Webb

Events
 Sunday April 20 – Seven thousand French troops start to recapture Quebec.
 Monday April 28 – Murray's 7,714 troops retire to the Citadel, after fighting the Canadiens outside the walls of Quebec. The French prepare to besiege.
 Friday May 9 – The belligerents, of each nationality, expect a fleet bringing troops and supplies. An approaching frigate proves to be British.
 Thursday May 15 – Two more British war-ships arrive. The British win a naval battle near Quebec.
 Saturday May 17 – The French raise the siege of Quebec.
 Sunday 6 July – Commencement of the Montreal Campaign by General Jeffery Amherst
 Saturday September 6 –  Amherst arrives at Montreal.
 September 6 to September 7 – A council of war, at Montreal, favors capitulation.
 Monday September 8 – Amherst's, Murray's, and Haviland's commands, around Montreal, are about 17,000.
 The articles of capitulation are agreeable to the French, except that they do not concede "all the honors of war" or "perpetual neutrality of Canadiens."
 De Levis threatens to retire to St. Helen's Island and fight to the last; but the Governor orders him to disarm.
 Fortress Louisbourg demolished by the British.
 Fall of Montreal and surrender of Great Lakes and Ohio Valley French forts to English. Lord Jeffery Amherst starts a "get tough with Indians" policy, including the first biological warfare --smallpox-infested blankets. Amherst granted some Seneca (originally his allies) lands to his officers. Odawa chief Pontiac (and the Delaware Prophet) organize a resistance preaching return to traditional Indian customs. The 1761 draft Proclamation (to English governors), and the Royal Proclamation of 1763 (with a large Indian country in what's now the U.S. Great Lakes/Midwest) were part of the English Crown's attempt to mollify the Indians. Neither proclamation of undisturbed Indian lands was followed by settlers or the Crown.
 The British Conquest. General James Murray is appointed first British military governor of Quebec.

Births
 November 10 – William Black, Methodist minister (d.1834)

Deaths
 January 22 : Paul Mascarene, governor of Nova Scotia

Historical documents
To avoid frostbite, orders are issued that Quebec City garrison be supplied with moccasins "for any duty whatsoever"

French train for planned escalade of Quebec City by climbing ladders against snow walls, "to the great amusement of the women and children"

British destroy gristmill and granary supporting Hôtel-Dieu nuns, who are threatened with banishment if they continue to correspond with French

French force of 10,000 repels attack of James Murray's 3,000 troops near Quebec City (its garrison having lost thousands to scurvy and winter)

"In the greatest confusion" - French abandon trenches outside Quebec (along with artillery, baggage etc.) when British ships arrive and attack

Governor General Vaudreuil stretches truth about Canada's prospects for victory in letter to militia commanders

Merchant at Quebec City expects no sale of goods shipped in "untill some decisive blow is struck[...]to open[...]a free Commerce with the Inhabitants"

Ursulines' agent in France regrets he's not able to send them assistance they need, but glad British "are making a very humane use of their victory"

Warships from Louisbourg destroy French supply ships waiting at Restigouche because British squadron has preceded them up St. Lawrence River

North American commander-in-chief Jeffery Amherst relates 7-week campaign down St. Lawrence (with scores drowned in rapids) to take Montreal

Murray relates month-long campaign up St. Lawrence to Montreal, gaining submission of parishes along way (except Sorel) as French retreat

"The Canadians are surrendering every-where" - British column from Quebec learns they are "terrified" of Johnson's approaching Indigenous fighters

Amherst announces Vaudreuil's and Canada's capitulation, noting French-aligned Indigenous people "shewed the utmost Complaisance to our Army"

Text of capitulation specifies continued enslavement of "Negroes and Panis" by their French and Canadian owners, except those made prisoner

Lt. John Knox tours Montreal and is more impressed with its gardens and "gay and sprightly" inhabitants than its defences

At conference with William Johnson, people of Kahnawake request liquor be banned, trade regulated, priests subsidized and home ground preserved

Military governors are authorized to commission current militia officers and have them collect civilian arms and settle minor disputes

"We now have none to make us afraid" - Boston sermon celebrates conquest of Canada, where "our Religion & Liberty" can now be propagated

Robert Rogers sends message to Detroit commandant to remove French garrison, and assures Wendat sachems that he comes in peace

Rogers accepts surrender of Detroit, directs capture of French forces south to Ohio River and makes treaty with Indigenous nations

For France, climate and expense of Canada make it "not worth their asking" in peace negotiations, unless to further contend for colonies

Indigenous people mention canoe routes between Fort Toronto and Lake Huron and to Thames River and Lake St. Clair

Nova Scotia Council to deport hundreds of Acadians from Chignecto region and Saint John River to make room for settlers from Europe

"Peace and Friendship" treaties signed or renewed by Nova Scotia government and Mi'kmaw, Wolastoqiyik (Maliseet), and Passamaquoddy peoples

"Great Incouragement to Industry" - Nova Scotia's bounties on hay, hemp, flax and oats, plus "good and sufficient Stone Wall" on Halifax Peninsula

Because of dung and garbage that butchers leave in streets, Halifax will have public slaughterhouse to provide meat to public market

References 

 
Canada
60